Karumathampatti is a Municipality in the  Coimbatore district in the state of Tamil Nadu, India. It is one of the prominent developing suburb in Coimbatore metropolitan area, about 25 km away from the city centre.  It is situated in between NH544 which connects the city of Coimbatore with Salem – Erode – Tirupur and also in between the State Highway 165 connects Annur – Kamanaikenpalayam. Nearby places are Somanur-3 km, Avinashi-10 km, Tirupur-20 km, Sulur-15 km, Annur-16 km. Coimbatore -27,Mettupalayam-38,Palladam-19. Karumathampatti lies near the junction of two major roads, NH544(Coimbatore – Salem) and Karumathampatti – Annur road.

Neighborhoods

 Somanur
 Vagarayampalayam
 Thekkalur
 Samalapuram
 Karanampettai
 Arasur
 Kaniyur
 Mangalam
 Avinashi
 Neelambur
 Vaazhaithottathu Ayyankoil
 Sitra
 Kalapatti
 Sangothipalayam
 Coimbatore Airport
 Vilankurichi

Demographics
 India census, Karumathampatti had a population of 26,162. Males constitute 51% of the population and females 49%. Karumathampatti has an average literacy rate of 69%, higher than the national average of 59.5%: male literacy is 77%, and female literacy is 62%. In Karumathampatti, 10% of the population is under 6 years of age.

Religion
Several temples, churches and mosques are located here.
Popular places of worship includes Arulmigu Vazhai Thottathu Ayyan Kovil, Senniandavar Kovil, and Basilica of Our Lady of Holy Rosary.

Educational Facilities
Some colleges and schools are listed below:

St. Mary's High School(Government Aided).
Panchayat Union Middle School - Elachipalayam

Private Schools

A.R.C. Matriculation Higher Secondary School
Holy Rosary Matriculation School
Kongu Vellalar Matriculation Higher Secondary School
Kongu Public School(CBSE)
Kovai Public School
Literacy Mission Matriculation Higher Secondary School
Sri Shakthi International School
Young India Public School

Private Engineering and Polytechnic Colleges
KPR Institute of Engineering and Technology
Tamil Nadu College of Engineering
KIT - KalaignarKarunanidhi Institute of Technology
Park College of Engineering and Technology
Tejaa Shakthi Institute Technology for Women
Jansons Institute of Technology
Architecture Colleges: Tamil Nadu School of Architecture
Nanjappa Polytechnic College
Arulmighu Chandikeshwarah Polytechnic College

Other Colleges
Jansons School of Business
St. Peter's College of Education

Transport Facilities

Karumathampatti is well connected by road and rail. It has roads connecting to various cities like Tiruppur, Salem, Erode, Mettupalayam, Sathyamangalam, and Mysore. Roads also connect to Sulthanpettai, Trichy Road, Annur, Sulur and Somanur. There is a TNSTC Bus Depot that operates buses to several places within and outside the district. The buses from Coimbatore (Gandipuram bus stand) to Tiruppur and from Pollachi to Mettupalayam goes through Karumathampatti.  While City Bus service No.20A plies to Gandhipuram and No.90A to Ukkadam and No.32 to Tirupur and Avinashi. Deluxe buses to Gandhipuram is also available.

The nearest railway station is situated at Somanur which links Coimbatore–Erode Rail line. All passenger trains stop here.

The Coimbatore International Airport is just 15 km away from Karumathampatti.

Buses between Coimbatore to various cities can be boarded in Karumathampatti.

Industry

Karumathampatti is one of the fast-growing towns in the Coimbatore Rural district. The main industry is textiles.

It also has an SEZ (special economic zone) with 900-acre MNC company named Aspen, Seforge, ZF and Suzlon.

It also has Anna Industrial Park which is in developing project with 700 acres.

References

 Karumathampatti Municipality
Cities and towns in Coimbatore district
Suburbs of Coimbatore